Stanisław Tym (born 17 July 1937 in Małkinia) is a Polish, actor, comedian, journalist and satirist, as well as a film and theatre director and writer. 

He coproduced and starred in many films of Stanisław Bareja, he gained much fame for his performance in the cult film of Marek Piwowski, Rejs (The Cruise). In 1990s he was a columnist of a popular Polish news magazine, Wprost, later for a newspaper Rzeczpospolita and since 2007 for Polityka.

Winner of many awards, among them Nagroda Kisiela for best columnist of 1998.

Works

Director
 Rozmowy przy wycinaniu lasu (1998)
 Dick (Ryś (Film), (2007)

Scripts
 Brunet Will Call (Brunet wieczorową porą, 1976)
 What Will You Do When You Catch Me? (Co mi zrobisz, jak mnie złapiesz?, 1978)
 Teddy Bear (Miś, 1980)
 Calls Controlled (Rozmowy kontrolowane, 1991)
 Rozmowy przy wycinaniu lasu (1998)
 Ryś, (2007)

Actor
 Octopus Cafe (Cafe Pod Minogą, 1959) - Partisan
 Nobody's Calling (Nikt nie woła, 1960)
 Kwiecień (1961) - Medic
 Penguin (Pingwin (Film), 1965) - Osetnik
 Walkower (Walkower (Film), 1965)
 Barrier (Bariera (Film), 1966) - Waiter
 Paris - Warsaw without Passport (Paryż - Warszawa bez wizy (Film), 1967) - American Soldier
 Hole in the Earth (Dziura w Ziemi (Film), 1970) - Member of Scientific Debate
 The Cruise (Rejs (Film), 1970) - Stowaway/Political Cultural Attaché
 Civil the Police Dog (Przygody psa Cywila (Film), 1971) - Thief
 A Jungle Book of Regulations (Nie ma róży bez ognia, 1974) - Zenek
 Czterdziestolatek (The Forty Year Old One) (Czterdziestolatek, 1974–1977) - Construction Worker
 Niespotykanie spokojny człowiek (Incredibly peaceful man) (Niespotykanie spokojny człowiek (Film), 1975) - Captain
 The Shadow Line (Smuga cienia (Film), 1976) - Jacobus
 What Will You Do When You Catch Me? (Co mi zrobisz, jak mnie złapiesz?, 1978) - Dudała / Szymek
 Teddy Bear (Miś, 1980) - Ryszard Ochódzki / Stanisław Paluch
 The War of the Worlds: Next Century (Wojna światów - Następne stulecie, 1981) - Secret Agent
 Calls Controlled (Rozmowy kontrolowane, 1991) - Ryszard Ochódzki
 Agata's Abduction (Uprowadzenie Agaty, 1993) - Homeless
 Rozmowy przy wycinaniu lasu (1998)
 Czy można się przysiąść (1999)
 Baśń o ludziach stąd (2003)
 The Incredibles (Iniemamocni, 2003) - Gilbert Huph (Polish Language Version)
 Dick (Ryś (Film), 2007) - Ryszard Ochódzki
 Niania (2008) - Czesław
 Only Love (Tylko miłość, 2008) - Mr. Sztern

References

External links
About Stanisław Tym - Filmweb.pl

1937 births
Living people
Polish male film actors
Polish male writers
Polish television actors
Polish theatre directors
People from Ostrów Mazowiecka County
Recipients of the Order of Polonia Restituta